Liam Anthony "William" Singe (born 2 July 1992) is an Australian YouTuber, singer, songwriter, and producer. He is most notable for his online videos on YouTube and Facebook.

Singe started his career as a member of The Collective, an Australian boy band which was formed during the fourth season of The X Factor Australia in 2012, finishing in third place. The Collective subsequently signed with Sony Music Australia and released seven singles and a self-titled album. They disbanded after Singe left the group in 2015.

In 2014 and 2015, Singe recorded numerous R&B, pop, reggae, hip-hop and rap covers in his bedroom. In less than a year, he accumulated over two million Facebook fans, reached a number one position on Spotify, 20 million Spotify streams, and earned more than 500 million video views and 2.6 million subscribers on YouTube.

Early life

William Singe was born and raised in Forestville, aka 'Forry', a suburb of northern Sydney. He is of Māori descent.

William began recording music as a child, drawing inspiration from his father, a singer and songwriter from Ngāti Porou, New Zealand.

He was a student at St Augustine's College in Brookvale and worked as a bank teller at the Commonwealth Bank in Dee Why.

Career
In 2011, Singe auditioned for The X Factor in season three and made it to the end of the bootcamp stage.

In 2012, he auditioned for the fourth season singing Justin Bieber's "One Less Lonely Girl" (with added rap lyrics that Singe wrote himself) and received positive comments from the judges. He progressed to the super bootcamp stage.

2012–2014: The Collective

After Singe did not to make it into the top six of the Under-25 Boys category during super bootcamp, the judges decided to put him together with Trent Bell, Julian De Vizio, Zach Russell and Jayden Sierra to form a boy band named The Collective. On 20 November 2012, it was announced that The Collective finished in third place.

On 22 November 2012, The Collective signed a recording contract with Sony Music Australia. The group's self-titled mini album, The Collective, was released on 14 December 2012. The album debuted at number 11 on the ARIA Albums Chart and was certified gold.

In 2013, Singe was featured on fellow X Factor contestant Bella Ferraro's single "Forgot You" which peaked at number 75 on the ARIA Singles Chart.

On 18 February 2015, Singe announced on Facebook that he had left the group to pursue his solo career. The remaining members of The Collective disbanded that same month to also pursue solo careers.

2015–present: Solo career
As a solo performer, Singe recorded cover tracks of contemporary singers, from Justin Bieber and Adele to Drake, Fetty Wap and The Weeknd. He sang in his bedroom and uploaded the videos to Facebook and YouTube. Starting 2015 with 6 cover videos and around 20 thousand followers on his Facebook page, Singe grew to more than two million followers by the end of the year with 44 additional cover videos.

Singe announced on 14 October that he signed to Paradigm, a US entertainment agency representing Ed Sheeran, Coldplay, Sia and Black Eyed Peas, among others.

In September and October, One Direction's Liam Payne and the singer T-Pain reached out via Twitter to connect with Singe, expressing interest to collaborate with him.

Singe covered Drake's song "Hotline Bling" on 24 September. It became his most popular video to date. In less than a month, the video earned close to 25 million views on YouTube and Facebook, reaching a number one position on Spotify's US Viral 50 chart.

Singe co-wrote "What You Want" for and with Samantha Jade, included on her album Nine, which was released in 2015.

Noting Singe's success, Capital Xtra concluded: "YouTube sensation William Singe is a star in his own right, having racked up millions of views across his phenomenal covers of Fetty Wap's '679,' The Weeknd's 'Earned It' and now Drake's 'Hotline Bling.' The 22-year-old Aussie singer-songwriter completely makes the song his own and it sounds incredible." The Fern Events, a South Sydney-based event solutions company, also commented that Singe was "just phenomenal, his perseverance is really paying off."

On 29 July, Singe announced that he had officially signed with RCA Records. His debut solo single was released on 3 February 2017, titled "Rush".

On 5 May 2017, he appeared on the Jonas Blue single "Mama", which became a top 10 hit in many countries, including Australia, UK, New Zealand, Germany, Norway, Denmark and South Africa.

On 13 June 2017, he reached 2 million subscribers on YouTube.

In January 2018, "Mama" was nominated for two Brit Awards. The ceremony would take place the following month.

Concert tours 

In January 2016, Singe embarked on The Introduction Tour across Australia, Asia, the United States and Europe. In February, March and April 2017, Will toured the United States with Alex Aiono on the "Changes Tour".

Discography

Singles

As lead artist

As featured artist

Notes

References

1992 births
21st-century Australian singers
Australian singer-songwriters
Australian male rappers
Australian people of Māori descent
Singers from Sydney
The X Factor (Australian TV series) contestants
Living people
21st-century Australian male singers
Australian male singer-songwriters